Richard (Rick) Brook is the most successful boys basketball coach in the history of Sebring McKinley High School (1968–1999); compiling 554 wins over 32 seasons (77%).  During the course of his Sebring career, Coach Brook dominated the Tri-County League winning 79% of his league games and taking home 18 championships.

The post-season saw Coach Brook win 18 Sectional, 8 District and 2 Regional championships with a state runner-up finish in 1970.

Rick was honored with a coach-of-the-year award 11 times by the Alliance Review and 13 times by the Mahoning Valley Coaches Association.

Other awards include the North/South All Star Game coach (1970), the Muskingum College Distinguished Coaching Award (1975) and the Paul Walker Award (1992).  He also served for 14 years as a district director for the Ohio High School Basketball Coaches Association.

In 2001, Coach Brook was inducted into the Ohio High School Basketball Coaches Hall of Fame, the Sebring High School Athletic Hall of Fame in 2005 and the East Palestine High School Hall of Fame in 2003.

At the time of his retirement after the 1999 season, coach was tied for 9th on the list of most wins in the history of Ohio high school basketball.

Note: All statistics sourced from, "Rick Brook - Coaching Career"

References

Basketball coaches